The Normand Edward Fontaine Bridge is a -long bascule bridge at  in Westport, Massachusetts, USA. Two lanes of Route 88 pass over the bridge from Westport Point and Wood Point in the Westport Point section of town to the Horseneck Beach State Reservation, connecting with Cherry & Webb Lane and, eventually, John Reed Road when Route 88 officially ends 0.3 miles south of the bridge's southern end.

The bridge, whose bascule channel spans , crosses over the East Branch of the Westport River, just east of where that branch begins.  The branch itself also branches at this point, with the main portion of the river turning north around Wood Point, and the Horseneck Channel to The Let leading southeastward.

The bridge, originally known as the Westport River Bridge, was built in 1958 to carry Route 88 to the Horseneck Beach State Reservation.  It was renamed in 1983 for Specialist 4th Class Normand Edward Fontaine, a Westport resident who was killed in the line of duty during the Vietnam War.  The rehabilitation and resurfacing of the bridge began in 2003, taking several years.

References

Bridges in Bristol County, Massachusetts
Road bridges in Massachusetts
Bascule bridges in the United States
1958 establishments in Massachusetts
Bridges completed in 1958